Bogdan Bucurica (born 11 February 1986) is a Romanian footballer who plays as a defender for CSU Alba Iulia.

Career
Bucurică began his professional career at "U" Alpan Târgoviște. During the summer of 2004, however, he was picked up by French second league side LB Châteauroux. He did not play there very much, being mainly injured.

During the summer of 2006, Bucurică signed for CFR Cluj. He injured himself before the start of the 2006-2007 season and was out until the summer of 2007.

Bucurică also played for the Romanian Under-19 national team.

Honours
Unirea Alba Iulia
Liga II: 2008-09

References

External links
 
 

Romanian footballers
Association football defenders
Living people
1986 births
Ligue 2 players
Liga I players
Liga II players
LB Châteauroux players
ACF Gloria Bistrița players
CFR Cluj players
CSM Unirea Alba Iulia players
CS Concordia Chiajna players
CS Universitatea Craiova players
FC Voluntari players
Romanian expatriate footballers
Expatriate footballers in France
Romanian expatriate sportspeople in France
Sportspeople from Târgoviște